Rafael Berges Martín (born 21 January 1971) is a Spanish former footballer who played as a left-back, currently a manager.

Playing career

Club
Born in Córdoba, Andalusia, Berges started playing for local Córdoba CF in the lower leagues. In the 1991–92 campaign he joined CD Tenerife, going on to spend two years in La Liga at the Estadio Heliodoro Rodríguez López.

Signing with RC Celta de Vigo in 1993, Berges went on to make nearly 200 overall appearances and score seven league goals for the Galicians. He took part in no games in his final two seasons, however, due to recurrent injuries.

At the end of 2001–02, aged 31, Berges retired with his first club Córdoba, now in the Segunda División. His second spell was cut short, again due to several physical problems.

International
Berges was first-choice for Spain at the 1992 Summer Olympics, as the nation won the gold medal on home soil. He scored twice, including in the 2–0 semi-final win over Ghana.

Coaching career
Berges took up coaching in 2005, starting with Córdoba CF B. Amongst other lowly sides, he would also manage UD Almería's reserves.

On 14 June 2012, Berges was named Córdoba's main squad head coach, replacing Rayo Vallecano-bound Paco Jémez. He was relieved of his duties on 7 April of the following year, with the team ranking ninth in the second division.

In the 2014–15 and 2016–17 campaigns, Berges was in charge of third-tier clubs Real Jaén and UD Logroñés, respectively. He went on to work in the Liga 1 (Indonesia), with PS Mitra Kukar and Badak Lampung FC.

Honours
Spain U23
Summer Olympic Games: 1992

References

External links

1971 births
Living people
Spanish footballers
Footballers from Córdoba, Spain
Association football defenders
La Liga players
Segunda División players
Segunda División B players
Córdoba CF players
CD Tenerife players
RC Celta de Vigo players
Spain under-21 international footballers
Spain under-23 international footballers
Footballers at the 1992 Summer Olympics
Olympic footballers of Spain
Medalists at the 1992 Summer Olympics
Olympic medalists in football
Olympic gold medalists for Spain
Spanish football managers
Segunda División managers
Segunda División B managers
Tercera División managers
Córdoba CF B managers
UD Almería B managers
Córdoba CF managers
Real Jaén managers
UD Logroñés managers
Badak Lampung F.C. managers
Spanish expatriate football managers
Expatriate football managers in Indonesia
Spanish expatriate sportspeople in Indonesia